Kelisia is a genus of delphacid planthoppers in the family Delphacidae. There are more than 50 described species in Kelisia.

Species
These 56 species belong to the genus Kelisia:

 Kelisia asahinai Hori, 1982
 Kelisia axialis Van Duzee, 1897
 Kelisia bajancogta Dlabola, 1965
 Kelisia bellatula Ding & Zhang, 1994
 Kelisia bicarinata Haupt, 1935
 Kelisia bimaculata Beamer, 1945
 Kelisia bispinifera Dlabola, 1967
 Kelisia brucki Fieber, 1878
 Kelisia confusa Linnavuori, 1957
 Kelisia creticola Asche, 1982
 Kelisia curvata Beamer, 1945
 Kelisia flagellata Beamer, 1945
 Kelisia flava Beamer, 1951
 Kelisia gargano Asche, 1982
 Kelisia guttula (Germar, 1818)
 Kelisia guttulifera (Kirschbaum, 1868)
 Kelisia hagemini Remane & Jung, 1995
 Kelisia halpina Remane & Jung, 1995
 Kelisia haupti Wagner, 1939
 Kelisia henschii Horváth, 1897
 Kelisia hyalina Beamer, 1945
 Kelisia irregulata Haupt, 1935
 Kelisia italica Guglielmino & Remane, 2002
 Kelisia melanops Fieber, 1878
 Kelisia melanura Vilbaste, 1968
 Kelisia minima Ribaut, 1934
 Kelisia monoceros Ribaut, 1934
 Kelisia nervosa Vilbaste, 1972
 Kelisia nigripennis Muir, 1929
 Kelisia occirrega Remane & Guglielmino, 2002
 Kelisia orchonica Dlabola, 1970
 Kelisia pallidula (Boheman, 1847)
 Kelisia pannonica Matsumura, 1910
 Kelisia parvata Ball
 Kelisia parvicurvata Beamer, 1951
 Kelisia parvula Ball, 1902
 Kelisia pascuorum Ribaut, 1934
 Kelisia pectinata Beamer, 1945
 Kelisia perrieri Ribaut, 1934
 Kelisia praecox Haupt, 1935
 Kelisia punctulum (Kirschbaum, 1868)
 Kelisia retrorsa Beamer, 1945
 Kelisia ribauti Wagner, 1938
 Kelisia riboceros Asche, 1987
 Kelisia sabulicola Wagner, 1952
 Kelisia sima Ribaut, 1934
 Kelisia snelli Muir, 1925
 Kelisia spinosa Beamer, 1945
 Kelisia sulcata Ribaut, 1934
 Kelisia tarda Haupt, 1935
 Kelisia torquata Beamer, 1951
 Kelisia vesiculata Beamer, 1951
 Kelisia vittata Muir, 1926
 Kelisia vittipennis (Sahlberg, 1868)
 Kelisia xiphura Vilbaste, 1968
 Kelisia yarkonensis Linnavuori, 1962

References

Further reading

 
 
 
 

Kelisiinae
Articles created by Qbugbot
Auchenorrhyncha genera